Roubík (Czech feminine: Roubíková) is a Czech surname. Notable people with the surname include:
 František Roubík (1890–1974), Czech historian
 Václav Roubík (1919–2013), Czech rower

See also
 Roubíček, a related surname

Czech-language surnames